Aldo Puglisi (born 12 April 1935) is an Italian actor.

Life and career 
Born in Catania, the son of two Sicilian language theatrical actors, Puglisi made his stage debut at very young age with the company of his parents. He made his film debut in a main role, as the vile seducer Peppino Califano in Pietro Germi's Seduced and Abandoned. Starting from his following film, Puglisi was gradually cast in less important roles, that led him to dedicate himself to theater.

Selected filmography 
 Seduced and Abandoned (1964) - Peppino Califano
 Three Nights of Love (1964) - (segment "La vedova")
 Marriage Italian Style (1964) - Alfredo
 Letti sbagliati (1965) - Maurizio (segment "Quel porco di Maurizio")
 Latin Lovers (1965) - Saro (segment "L'irreparabile")
 The Birds, the Bees and the Italians (1966) - Carabiniere Mancuso
 Peggio per me... meglio per te (1967) - Giorgio de Santis
 The Girl with the Pistol (1968) - Un emigrante siciliano
 Vacanze sulla Costa Smeralda (1968) - Tiberio, Gianna's fiancé
 Love and Anger (1969) - Dio (segment "La sequenza del fiore di carta") (voice)
 Un caso di coscienza (1970) - ragionier Licasio
 Il merlo maschio (1971) - Chemist
 When Women Lost Their Tails (1972) - Zog
 The Eroticist (1972) - Carmelino the chauffeur
 All Screwed Up (1974) - Cook
 Swept Away (1974) - Gennarino's fellow
 Il giustiziere di mezzogiorno (1975) - Fernando
 La prima notte di nozze (1976)
 Arrivano i gatti (1980) - Tenente La Pezza
 Secret File (2003)
 Quell'estate felice (2007) - (final film role)

References

External links 

1935 births
Italian male stage actors
Italian male film actors
Italian male television actors
20th-century Italian male actors
Actors from Catania
Living people